Krettamia is a settlement in the Sahara Desert of western Algeria.

Geography of Tindouf Province